Armen Weitzman (born December 19, 1983) is an American actor and comedian best known for playing Garfield in the Comedy Central series Another Period.

Early life
Weitzman was born and raised in Los Angeles, California, the son of lawyer Howard Weitzman and Margaret Weitzman. He is of Armenian and European Jewish descent. He attended Emerson College, where he met best friend and collaborator Harris Wittels, but did not graduate.

Career
Weitzman is a regular performer at the Upright Citizens Brigade Theater in Los Angeles. He has appeared in television and film projects such as Burning Love, The Sarah Silverman Program, Childrens Hospital, Role Models, School for Scoundrels, Love, and Ocean's Thirteen. He was also on the short-lived MTV show Zach Stone Is Gonna Be Famous as the title character's best friend, Greg LeBlanc. In 2009, he starred in the Say Anything music video for "Shiksa (Girlfriend)". Alongside Wittels, Weitzman made his directorial debut in 2014 with the short film The Badger's Promise, which the pair also co-starred in as fictionalized versions of themselves. He co-starred as the servant Garfield in the Comedy Central show Another Period, and appeared as Jeff in Silicon Valley, as Ruby in Netflix's Love, and as Lorne Michaels in A Futile and Stupid Gesture.

Weitzman was awarded the Heart of a Chompian Award on the March 30, 2017 episode of the Doughboys podcast. Despite this, on the August 1, 2019 episode of Doughboys, Weitzman was formally banned from returning by hosts Nick Wiger and Mike Mitchell and guest R.J. Fried.

On July 23, 2019, multiple news outlets picked up the story of a seemingly pristine Double-Double from In-N-Out Burger found on the streets of Queens, New York City, over 1,500 miles from the nearest In-N-Out. Several NBC affiliates specified that the burger was "not Armen style", referring to Weitzman's topping order of half grilled onions, half raw onions, which was popularized through Doughboys.

Weitzman's philosophy and catchphrase is the Weitzman-invented word "karf", for which he formerly held the trademark.

Filmography

Film

Television

Music videos

References

External links

 

1983 births
Living people
Emerson College alumni
American people of Austrian-Jewish descent
American people of Armenian descent
Upright Citizens Brigade Theater performers
Comedians from California
21st-century American comedians